Nihil novi nisi commune consensu ("Nothing new without the common consent") is the original Latin title of a 1505 act or constitution adopted by the Polish Sejm (parliament), meeting in the royal castle at Radom.

Etymology 
The Latin expression, "nihil novi" ("nothing new"), had previously appeared in the Vulgate Bible phrase, "nihil novi sub sole" ("there is nothing new under the sun"), in Ecclesiastes 1:9.

"Nihil novi" in this political sense, is interpreted in the vernacular as "Nothing about us without us" (in Polish, "Nic o nas bez nas").

History

Nihil novi effectively established "nobles' democracy" in what came to be known as the Polish "Commonwealth [or Republic] of the Nobility". It was a major component of the evolution and eventual dominant position of the Polish parliament (Sejm).

Nihil novi 
It was signed by King Alexander Jagiellon on 31 March and passed by Sejm on 30 May.

The Sejm'''s 1505 Act of Nihil novi nisi commune consensu marked an important victory for Poland's nobility over her kings. It forbade the king to issue laws without the consent of the nobility, represented by the Senat and Chamber of Deputies, except for laws governing royal cities, crown lands (królewszczyzny), mines, fiefdoms, royal peasants, and Jews.Nihil novi invalidated the Privilege of Mielnik, which had strengthened only the magnates, and it thus tipped the balance of power in favor of the Chamber of Deputies (the formally lower chamber of the Parliament), where the ordinary nobility held sway. Nihil novi is often regarded as initiating the period in Polish history known as "Nobles' Democracy," which was but a limited democracy as only male nobility (szlachta) were able to participate (the nobility constituting some ten percent of the Republic's population, still a higher eligible percentage than in much of Europe).

That same year, the nobility further expanded their power by abrogating most cities' voting rights in the Sejm and by forbidding peasants to leave their lands without permission from their feudal lords, thereby firmly establishing a "second serfdom" in Poland.

 Text 

See also
 List of Latin phrases
 Nothing About Us Without Us
 Polish–Lithuanian Commonwealth
 Szlachta privileges

References

Sources
 Norman Davies, God's Playground:  A History of Poland in Two Volumes.  Volume I:  The Origins to 1795, New York, Columbia University Press, 1982, .
 Sebastian Piątkowski, Radom:  zarys dziejów miasta (Radom:  A Brief History of the City), Radom, 2000, .
 Adam Zamoyski, The Polish Way:  A Thousand-Year History of the Poles and Their Culture'', New York, Hippocrene Books, 1994, .

External links 
 Latin version of act (Starting in second section of page)

1505 in law
1505 in Poland
Legal history of Poland
Latin words and phrases
Latin legal terminology
Constitutions of Poland
Sejm of the Polish–Lithuanian Commonwealth